Charles Ho Tsu-kwok, GBM (born 23 June 1949) is a Hong Kong businessman who was the chairman of the Sing Tao News Corporation Limited between 2001 and 2021 and an independent non-executive director of Shun Tak Holdings. As a member of the pro-Beijing camp, Ho maintains good relations with the Chinese government, and is appointed as a National Committee Member of the Chinese People's Political Consultative Conference representing Fujian, serving in that post since 1998. Ho was awarded the Grand Bauhinia Medal, the highest award under the Hong Kong honours and awards system by Chief Executive CY Leung on July 1, 2014, although the decision to award Ho with such an award sparked controversy in the Hong Kong media.

Early life
Ho was born in Hong Kong with family roots in Fujian. He was the grandson of Ho Ying-chie (1911-2000), the founder and owner of the Hong Kong Tobacco Cooperation Limited, and the brother of David Ho, a Vancouver based entrepreneur. Ho founded the Sing Tao Newspaper Group Limited in 2001.

Events

Relation with CY Leung 
On 9 December 2011, Ho, an outspoken supporter of Chief Executive Election candidate Henry Tang, publicly challenged Tang's opponent CY Leung in a press conference, questioning his ability to handle the top job in Hong Kong. Ho noted that one of Leung's companies, DTZ Holdings, has the values of its shares decreased to zero and declared bankruptcy, and thus fearing that "Hong Kong's economy would become zero because of Leung's wrong decisions.

However, in an interview on 30 August 2014, Ho withdrew his accusation towards CY Leung by praising Leung's efforts in improving people's livelihood, saying that Leung's decisions "hasn't made Hong Kong's economy become zero yet".

Awarded the Grand Bauhinia Medal
On July 1, 2014, Ho was awarded the Grand Bauhinia Medal, the highest award under the Hong Kong honours and awards system by Chief Executive CY Leung for his "distinguished service to the community, particularly his contribution to the media industry." The decision to award Ho the highest honor sparked dismay among some Hong Kong media. Ho is originally considered a staunch supporter Henry Tang, CY Leung's major opponent in the 2012 Chief Executive Election. However, he switched sides and praised Leung as a competent leader immediately after he was elected, and has since then been a staunch supporter of CY Leung's government. Some media expressed opinions that Ho does not deserve the award, as they believe only "true heroes" should be honored instead of a "Yes man" like Ho.

Objections to "Civil Nomination"
In an interview on 30 August 2014, Ho commented on the civil nomination proposal demanded by members of the pro-democracy camp for the 2017 Chief Executive election, saying that there is no such thing as a "civil nomination" in any political system worldwide, and that he feared that the adoption of a "civil nomination" for Chief Executive may ultimately result in triads nominated for the post.

Reported entry denied to US 
In early December 2019, there were unconfirmed reports that Ho was denied entry to the United States after the passing of Hong Kong Human Rights and Democracy Act. Ho denied the rumour and sued an online media for libel.

Politics 
In December 2021, it was reported that Ho had a "privileged" vote in the 2021 Hong Kong legislative election, where the vote would count approximately 7,215 times more than an ordinary citizen.

Awards 
2014: Grand Bauhinia Medal

References

1949 births
Living people
Hong Kong businesspeople
Recipients of the Grand Bauhinia Medal
Members of the National Committee of the Chinese People's Political Consultative Conference
Members of the Selection Committee of Hong Kong
Members of the Election Committee of Hong Kong, 1998–2000
Members of the Election Committee of Hong Kong, 2000–2005
Members of the Election Committee of Hong Kong, 2007–2012
Members of the Election Committee of Hong Kong, 2012–2017
Members of the Election Committee of Hong Kong, 2017–2021
Members of the 13th Chinese People's Political Consultative Conference
Sing Tao News Corporation